Gary DeGrio (born February 16, 1960) is an American former professional ice hockey Forward. DeGrio was member of the Tulsa Oilers (CHL) team that suspended operations on February 16, 1984, playing only road games for final six weeks of 1983–84 season. Despite this adversity, the team went on to win the league's championship.

Playing career
As a professional, DeGrio played with the Tulsa Oilers in the CHL for the 1982–83 and 1983–84 seasons, and then spent the next three season with the Salt Lake Golden Eagles  in the IHL, before playing his final season (1987–88) of hockey with the Dundee Tigers.

Championships
He won the 1983–84 CHL Championship (Adams Cup) as a member of the Tulsa Oilers team coached by Tom Webster.

Personal life
Both DeGrio's brother-in-law Dave and nephew Adam play hockey. His brother-in-law Dave played NCAA hockey for the University of Minnesota-Duluth while his nephew Adam plays for the Wilkes-Barre/Scranton Penguins in the American Hockey League.

References

External links
 

1960 births
Living people
Tulsa Oilers (1964–1984) players
Minnesota Duluth Bulldogs men's ice hockey players
Salt Lake Golden Eagles (IHL) players
American men's ice hockey forwards